Aleksandr Aleksandrovich Rudenko (born 15 March 1999) is a Russian football player who plays for FC Khimki.

Club career
He made his debut in the Russian Football National League for FC Spartak-2 Moscow on 11 July 2016 in a game against FC Sibir Novosibirsk.

On 26 December 2019 he joined FC Torpedo Moscow on loan until the end of the 2019–20 season.

On 25 July 2020 he moved to Sochi on loan for the 2020–21 season, with an option to purchase.

On 19 February 2022, Rudenko signed a contract with Khimki until the end of the 2023–24 season.

Career statistics

References

External links
 
 
 
 Profile by Russian Football National League

1999 births
Sportspeople from Rostov Oblast
Russian people of Ukrainian descent
Living people
Russian footballers
Russia youth international footballers
Association football forwards
FC Spartak Moscow players
FC Spartak-2 Moscow players
FC Torpedo Moscow players
PFC Sochi players
FC Khimki players
Russian Premier League players
Russian First League players